Gilberto Celestino (born February 13, 1999) is a Dominican professional baseball outfielder for the Minnesota Twins of Major League Baseball (MLB).

Career

Houston Astros
Celestino signed with the Houston Astros as an international free agent on July 2, 2015, for a $2.25 million signing bonus. He split the 2016 season between the DSL Astros and the GCL Astros, hitting a combined .257/.365/.393/.758 with 2 home runs and 19 RBI. He spent the 2017 season with the Greeneville Astros, hitting .268/.331/.379/.709 with 4 home runs and 24 RBI.

Minnesota Twins
On July 27, 2018, Celestino and Jorge Alcalá were traded to the Minnesota Twins in exchange for Ryan Pressly. Celestino split the 2018 season between the Tri-City ValleyCats, Corpus Christi Hooks, and the Elizabethton Twins, hitting a combined .287/.341/.406/.747 with 5 home runs and 34 RBI.

In 2019, Celestino split the season between the Cedar Rapids Kernels and the Fort Myers Miracle, hitting a combined .277/.349/.410/.759 with 10 home runs and 54 RBI. Celestino played for the Dominican Republic national baseball team at the 2019 WBSC Premier12. On November 20, 2019, Celestino was added to the Twins 40-man roster. Celestino did not play in a game in 2020 due to the cancellation of the minor league season because of the COVID-19 pandemic.

On June 2, 2021, Celestino was promoted to the major leagues for the first time. He made his MLB debut that day as the starting center fielder against the Baltimore Orioles. In the game, he went 0-for-2 before being subbed out for Miguel Sanó. On June 9, Celestino notched his first career hit, a single off of New York Yankees reliever Brooks Kriske. He appeared in 23 games for Minnesota in his rookie campaign, hitting .136/.177/.288 with 2 home runs and 3 RBI. In 2022, Celestino appeared in 122 contests with the Twins, slashing .238/.313/.302 with 2 home runs and 24 RBI.

On March 2, 2023, Celestino suffered a ruptured ulnar collateral ligament in his left thumb, and underwent thumb surgery that included a recovery period of 6-8 weeks.

References

External links

1999 births
Living people
Cedar Rapids Kernels players
Corpus Christi Hooks players
Dominican Republic expatriate baseball players in the United States
Dominican Republic national baseball team players
Dominican Summer League Astros players
Elizabethton Twins players
Fort Myers Miracle players
Gigantes del Cibao players
Greeneville Astros players
Gulf Coast Astros players
Major League Baseball outfielders
Major League Baseball players from the Dominican Republic
Minnesota Twins players
Tri-City ValleyCats players
Sportspeople from Santo Domingo
Wichita Wind Surge players
2019 WBSC Premier12 players